Mount Zion High School may refer to:

 Mount Zion High School (Carrollton, Georgia)
 Mount Zion High School (Jonesboro, Georgia)
 Mount Zion High School (Illinois), Mount Zion, Illinois

See also
 Mount Zion (disambiguation)#Education
 Mount Zion Christian Academy